Samuel Genersich (February 15, 1768 in Kežmarok – September 2, 1844 in Levoča) was a Carpathian German physician and botanist.

He was the son of Christian Genersich, merchant in Kežmarok, and his wife Anna Susanna born Royko. He was the younger brother of Johann Genersich, professor at the lyceum in Kežmarok and of Christian Genersich, a Lutheran pastor there.

Genersich studied in Kežmarok and graduated in medicine in Vienna. He practiced medicine for six years in Kežmarok, and was subsequently appointed municipal physician in Levoča. In this capacity he published the Belehrung in 1839.

In botany he published his Elenchus in 1798 and the Catalogus in 1801. A manuscript for a Flora Scepusiaca remains unpublished.

He collaborated with Göran Wahlenberg on his work about the plant taxonomy and geography of the High Tatras. Genersich was also in intensive  contact with Pál Kitaibel. Kitaibel's herbarium at the Hungarian National Museum in Budapest contains many plants collected by Genersich.

He was married to Johanna Fabritzy and had six children.
  
Samuel Genersich was an honorary member of the Botanical Society of Regensburg.

The genus Genersichia (Cyperaceae) was named for him by János Heuffel, as was Dianthus genersichii Gyorffy (Caryophyllaceae).

Publications 

 Samuelis Genersich Hungari Késmarkiensis Medicinae Doctoris et Civitatis L. R. Leutschoviensis Physici ordinarii Florae Scepusiensis Elenchus seu Enumeratio plantarum in Comitatu Hungariae Scepusiensi, eumque percurrentibus montibus Carpathicis sponte crescentium. Sumptibus Auctoris. Leutschoviae typis Michaelis Podhorânszki, de eadem 1798.
 Samuelis Genersich Catalogus Plantarum rariorum Scepusii A. 1801 in autumno in usum amicorum conscriptus, a Samuele Genersich Medicinae Doctore, et Civitatis L. R. Leutschoviensis Physico Ord.
 Belehrung für das Publicum der kön. Freistadt Leutschau in Hinsicht der sich geäusserten Rindviehseuche. Leutschau i839

References 

 Aurel W. Scherfel Der älteste botanische Schriftsteller Zipsens und sein Herbar
 Baráthová, N. & al. Osobnosti Kežmarku 1206 – 2009. Jadro 2009

1768 births
1844 deaths
People from Kežmarok
Carpathian German people
19th-century Hungarian botanists
18th-century Slovak physicians